Ursu River may refer to:

 Ursu, a tributary of the Jiul de Vest in Hunedoara County, Romania
 Ursu, a tributary of the Schit in Neamț County, Romania

See also 
 Ursa River, a tributary of the Danube in Olt County, Romania
 Ursul (disambiguation)
 Ursoaia River (disambiguation)
 Pârâul Ursului (disambiguation)
 Valea Ursului River (disambiguation)